Marvin O'Neal, professionally known by his stage name Marv Won, is an American rapper and record producer from east side Detroit, Michigan. He is a member of underground hip hop group the Fat Killahz (with Fatt Father, Bang Belushi and King Gordy) and rap duo Twin Towers (with Fatt Father). In 2021, he received a Detroit Music Award nomination for Outstanding Rap MC at the 30th Detroit Music Awards.

Career

Worlds's Largest Group

O'Neal and Shabazz Ford had started The Fat Killahz along with Shim-E-Bango and King Gordy in 2001. The rap group performed at Detroit spots like the Lush Lounge, the Blind Pig, Motor, St. Andrew's Hall, the Shelter, the State Theater, and rapidly gained respect in the streets and a devoted following. In 2002 the quartet decided it was time to hit the studio, and they released the 2 Fat, 2 Furious mixtape to positive reactions throughout Detroit city. Making an appearance on King Gordy's debut solo album The Entity, they followed up a successful run supporting Gordy as the opening act on D12's US tour in 2004 with the release of their WFKR 31.3 FKM: FK Radio The Mixtape. On March 15, 2005, the World's Largest Group dropped their debut studio album "Guess Who's Coming To Dinner?" via No Tyze Entertainment, featuring production by notable Mr. Porter and B.R. Gunna among others and Marv also co-produced one track off the record.

Way of the Won and Wayne Fontes Music
Due to Fat Killahz hiatus until 2011, the band members still participated in their individual projects and Marv has featured on many fellow rappers projects. That was the material for the debut solo release, and in December 2009 has been released he eleven track album named Way of the Won featured audio production from Kon Artis and Black Milk (with whom Marv worked during F.K.'s first project) among others, and featured guest appearances by Danny Brown, Bilal, Fatt Father & Shim-E-Bango. Marv was signed to Kon Artis and Kuniva's record label Runyon Ave Records and released his next project Wayne Fontes Music a month after his previous album, on January 1, 2010. The fourteen track LP featured the likes of Dwele, Riodata, Fatt Father & Shim-E-Bango.

Heavy Is the Head and Twin Towers
In 2011, Marv and The Fat Killahz teamed up once again to drop their extended play The E.P., and to be featured on Shim-E-Bango's The Bridgecard and Gordy's Jesus Christ's Mistress projects before the band's second hiatus. Porter resigned O'Neil on his brand new My Own Planet imprint and they began to work on the new project. The nine-track EP Heavy Is the Head... was released on October 16, 2012. It featured guest appearances from Royce da 5'9", Young R.O.C. and The Fat Killahz, among with audio production notably handled by both Denaun and Marv who also served as executive producers. In 2012, Marv appeared in the intro track on Slaughterhouse album Welcome to: Our House.

In 2013, fresh off the success of their latest solo efforts, Heavy Is the Head... and FatherHood, Marv & Fatts teamed up as the Twin Towers and recorded several songs.

Marv released non-album track "Field Nigga" produced by Big Tone on June 20, 2014 via My Own Planet, and co-produced D12's track "Bane" on Shady XV.

Birthday Boys and Soundtrack of Autumn

Marv One collaborated with another KingOfTheDot battle rap winner, Illmaculate. The duo dropped their self-titled 7-track extended play Birthday Boys, on their birthday on the fourth of February.

In the Fatt Father's interview made on March 15, 2016 to Extraordinary Nobodies blog, Fatts stated about the Twin Towers that their new material "hopefully it will be released after we both drop our solo projects"

On November 18, 2016, a week after Fatt Father's Veterans Day record release, Marv dropped his fourth solo project, Soundtrack Of Autumn, via Rappers I Know, produced entirely by himself. The ten track album features Boldy James, Nolan The Ninja, Gwenation, The Fat Killahz and a bonus track "Suicide Squad" featured Royce Da 5'9", which was previously released on November 14.

A limited edition vinyl release for Soundtrack of Autumn was released on April 27, 2018 through The What of Whom. For this release, real autumn leaves were pressed inside clear vinyl and also included the two bonus tracks with The Fat Killahz and Royce da 5'9".

Battle rap 
O'Neal rose back around 2000 at Lush's Wednesday open mic nights in Hamtramck, where he learned the ropes with Proof, Obie Trice, D12 and Slum Village. Ever since he's become a staple of freestyle battles. Marv has been prominent on the battle rap scene for more than a decade, gaining international attention since as early as the World Rap Championships. He continues to participate in the rap battles, sometimes as a double team with Kimani Graham (known as Quest Mcody).

Filmography 
Marv was one of many Detroit rappers who appeared as an extra in "8 Mile", He rapped against Eminem in a battling scene, but that scene was left out of the movie. Marv explained, when the DVD was released, "It was really huge for me because that was one of the main scenes they sold the DVD on. That was the footage they sent to 'Entertainment Tonight,' 'Extra' and 'Access Hollywood'..."

Director and writer Dionciel Armstrong, known for having a hand in the Street Life DVD that introduced the world to Trick-Trick has announced a new independent feature film, Five K One, starring rappers Yukmouth, Big Herk, Quest M.C.O.D.Y., Forty Da Great, Marvwon, Clifton Powell and Melvin Jackson Jr. of The Wire. The film’s score was arranged and mixed by Steve King, who’s long been Eminem’s go-to mixer.

Discography

Studio albums
 Way of the Won (2005)
 Wayne Fontes Music (2010)
 Soundtrack of Autumn (2016)
 Sooner than Later (2020)

Extended plays
 Heavy Is the Head… (2012)
 Birthday Boys (with Illmaculate) (2016)
 Until… (2020)
 Rabbits Can't Shoot (2021)
 Hagler (2021)

Guest appearances

Awards and nominations 

!
|-
|align=center| 2021
| Himself
| Detroit Music Award for Outstanding Rap MC
|
| 
|-

References

External links
 Twitter
 MySpace
 BandCamp
 Instagram

1981 births
Living people
Underground rappers
Rappers from Detroit
American male rappers
Midwest hip hop musicians
21st-century American rappers
21st-century American male musicians